A cavernous liver hemangioma or hepatic hemangioma is a benign tumor of the liver composed of hepatic endothelial cells. It is the most common benign liver tumour, and is usually asymptomatic and diagnosed incidentally on radiological imaging. Liver hemangiomas are thought to be congenital in origin. Several subtypes exist, including the giant hepatic haemangioma, which can cause significant complications.

Diagnosis

Liver hemangiomas are typically hyperechoic on ultrasound though may occasionally be hypoechoic; ultrasound is not diagnostic. Computed tomography (CT), magnetic resonance imaging (MRI) or single-photon emission computed tomography (SPECT) using autologous labelled Red Blood Cells (RBC) with Tc-99m is diagnostic. Biopsy is avoided due to the risk of haemorrhage.

Hepatic hemangiomas can occur as part of a clinical syndrome, for example Klippel–Trénaunay syndrome, Osler–Weber–Rendu syndrome and Von Hippel–Lindau syndrome.

Types
 Typical hepatic hemangioma
 Atypical hepatic hemangioma
 Giant hepatic hemangioma
 Flash filling hepatic hemangioma – can account for up to 16% of all hepatic hemangiomas
 Calcified hepatic hemangioma
 Hyalinized hepatic hemangioma
 Other unusual imaging patterns
 Hepatic hemangioma with capsular retraction
 Hepatic hemangioma with surrounding regional nodular hyperplasia
 Hepatic hemangioma with fatty infiltration
 Pedunculated hepatic hemangioma
 Cystic hepatic hemangioma – rare
 Fluid-fluid level containing hepatic hemangioma – rare

Giant hepatic hemangioma

This large, atypical hemangioma of the liver may present with abdominal pain or fullness due to hemorrhage, thrombosis or mass effect. It may also lead to left ventricular volume overload and heart failure due to the increase in cardiac output which it causes. Further complications are Kasabach–Merritt syndrome, a form of consumptive coagulopathy due to thrombocytopaenia, and rupture.

Imaging follow-up
A United States practice is to perform liver ultrasound at 6 months and 12 months after the initial diagnosis, and if the size has not increased, further follow-up is not necessary. Particular situations that may indicate imaging are:
 New onset abdominal pain
 Initiation of estrogen therapy
 Pregnancy
 Hemangiomas larger than 10 cm, where it can be appropriate to perform an ultrasound follow-up annually.

See also
 Hemangioma
 Liver tumour

References

External links 

Benign neoplasms
Hepatology